Edlington railway station was a small railway station at the eastern terminus of the Dearne Valley Railway. The station's full title as shown on the station nameboard is "Edlington for Balby Doncaster" (with the words 'for' and 'Doncaster' in lettering half size compared to the others). It was built to serve the mining village of Edlington and the Doncaster suburb of Balby in South Yorkshire, England.

The station, like others on the Dearne Valley, consisted of a bed of sleepers set at track level with an old L&Y coach body lit by a couple of gas lamps for a waiting shelter. The large station sign was removed in the late 1920s and replaced by a simple "Edlington".

The station was opened for passengers on 3 June 1912 and ceased on 10 September 1951. The passenger service was originally operated by a Hughes-designed 'railmotor' which was fitted with vacuum-operated retractable steps, thus saving on platform building. At first, trains were operated on behalf of the DVR by the Lancashire and Yorkshire Railway; when that company amalgamated with the London and North Western Railway on 1 January 1922, the combined organisation (also known as the London and North Western Railway) absorbed the DVR on the same day.

See also 
 List of closed railway stations in Britain

References

Further reading
 Railways in South Yorkshire by C. T. Goode.  Dalesman Publications

External links 

 The station on navigable 1935 OS map

Disused railway stations in Doncaster
Former Dearne Valley Railway stations
Railway stations in Great Britain opened in 1912
Railway stations in Great Britain closed in 1951
1912 establishments in England